John Thulis (also spelled Thules, Thewlis) (c. 1568 – 18 March 1616) was an English Roman Catholic priest. He is a Catholic martyr, beatified in 1987.

Life
Thulis was born at Up Holland, Lancashire, probably about 1568. His baptism is recorded in the Whalley Parish Register on the 28th of December, 1568, the son of William. He arrived at the English College, Reims, 25 May 1583, and received tonsure from Cardinal Louis de Guise on 23 September following. He left for Rome, 27 March 1590, where he was ordained priest, and was sent on the English mission in April 1592.

He seems to have been a prisoner at Wisbech Castle, Cambridgeshire, when he signed the letter of 8 November 1598, in favour of the institution of the archpriest, and the letter of 17 November 1600, against it. Later he worked in Lancashire, where he was arrested by William Stanley, 6th Earl of Derby, and was committed to Lancaster Castle.

A metrical account of his martyrdom, as well as portions of a poem composed by Thulis, were printed by John Hungerford Pollen in his Acts of the English Martyrs (London, 1891), 194-207.

See also
 Catholic Church in the United Kingdom
 Douai Martyrs

References

Attribution

1616 deaths
16th-century English Roman Catholic priests
English beatified people
People executed by Stuart England by hanging, drawing and quartering
17th-century venerated Christians
Eighty-five martyrs of England and Wales
Year of birth uncertain
Year of birth unknown
People from Up Holland
Executed people from Lancashire